Yazıhan  is a district of Malatya Province of Turkey. The mayor is Nevzat Öztürk (AKP).

Main economical activities are agriculture and trade.

Notable People 

 Sebahat Tuncel, Kurdish politician in Turkey

References

Populated places in Malatya Province
Districts of Malatya Province